SES-7 (also formerly known as ProtoStar-2 / Indostar-2) is a commercial communications satellite operated by SES World Skies, then SES S.A.

Spacecraft 
ProtoStar-2 is a geosynchronous communications satellite built by Boeing. It is a BSS-601HP satellite bus. On 15 November 2002, PanAmSat terminated its contract with Boeing Satellite Systems (BSS) for the almost-completed Galaxy-8iR satellite, claiming that Boeing had defaulted on the terms of the contract, and requested US$72 million from Boeing to refund prior advance payments and other costs. The satellite was later converted into the ProtoStar-2 satellite, which was launched in May 2009. Late 2009, it is purchased through auction by SES S.A. for SES World Skies unit for US$180 million. The satellite was renamed SES-7 in May 2010.

Launch 
Launched on 16 May 2009 at 00:57:38 UTC, since Baikonur Cosmodrome, Site 200/39 for ProtoStar Ltd by Proton-M / Briz-M launch vehicle. Launch arranged by International Launch Services (ILS).

Market 
It is positioned at 108.2° East longitude and serve customers in Indonesia, India, Taiwan, the Philippines and Southeast Asia. Protostar 2 carries 10 (+3) S-band and 22 (+5) Ku-band transponders for optimized HD satellite television direct-to-home (DTH) satellite television service and broadband Internet access across the Asia-Pacific region. The S-band payload is operated under the name of Indostar-2 (Cakrawarta-2).

See also

References 

Communications satellites in geostationary orbit
Satellites using the BSS-601 bus
Spacecraft launched in 2009
SES satellites
Satellites of Luxembourg